The Church ruins in Belsh, Elbasan County, Albania have been designated a Cultural Monument of Albania in 1973.

References

Cultural Monuments of Albania
Belsh
Church ruins in Albania